James Gregory Scheffer (born June 8, 1970), professionally known as Jim Jonsin, is an American record producer, songwriter, businessman and DJ from South Florida. Jonsin has collaborated with numerous artists, including Beyoncé, Kelly Rowland, Usher, Lil Wayne, Kid Cudi, Eminem, Pitbull, Yelawolf, Nelly, T.I., Danity Kane and Jamie Foxx, among others. Jonsin won a Grammy in 2009, for Best Rap Song for Lil Wayne's "Lollipop". That year he was also nominated for his production on T.I.'s "Whatever You Like", which also garnered a nomination for Best Rap Song.

Jonsin has contributed production to albums including Beyoncé's I Am... Sasha Fierce (2010 Best Contemporary R&B album), Lil Wayne's Tha Carter III (2008 Best Rap Album), Usher's Raymond v. Raymond (2011 Best Contemporary R&B album), and Usher's "There Goes My Baby" (2011 Best Male R&B Vocal Performance), and Eminem's Recovery (2011 Best Rap Album and Album of the Year).

In 2006, Jonsin launched Rebel Rock Entertainment, his own record label imprint and subsequently signed a then unknown musician by the name of B.o.B. Jonsin then partnered with Atlantic Records, and later Grand Hustle, in a joint venture deal to work on B.o.B.'s debut album, The Adventures of Bobby Ray (2010). The album, which was executive produced by Jonsin and T.I., debuted at number 1 on the Billboard 200.

He also signed the production duo, FnZ, and Danny Morris to his production company, Rebel Rock Productions. In addition to his ventures in music, he entered into the field of professional racing in February 2012 by forming his own motorsports team, Rebel Rock Racing. Jonsin will be driving a Porsche 911 in the upcoming Grand-am Road Racing series with co-driver D.J. Randall.

Music career
In the late 1990s, Jonsin was no longer on tour and returned to Miami to produce more bass records and eventually landed a position as an engineer at Slip N Slide records. At the label Jim produced records for Trick Daddy and Trina. In 2004 Jonsin went on to write and produce Trick Daddy's hit single "Let's Go" (featuring Lil Jon & Twista). Soon after the success of this song Jonsin went on to work with Miami rapper Pitbull and produced "Dammit Man" off the rapper's debut album M.I.A.M.I., which was certified Gold. The music industry began to take notice of the Miami-based producer and Jonsin was tapped by Bad Boy Records to produce a record for the group which was made widely popular by the MTV reality show, Making the Band, Danity Kane. Jonsin produced their single entitled "Show Stopper" which went on to be certified Gold by the RIAA.

In 2008, Jonsin wrote and produced for Lil Wayne's 5× platinum single "Lollipop" released in early 2008. The song was at #1 on Billboard's Hot 100 chart for 5 weeks which was the first time Lil Wayne had achieved this chart position. In addition to the chart success at the 51st Grammys Jonsin won for Best Rap Song.
	
A few months after the release of "Lollipop", Jonsin followed up with writing and producing T.I.'s 5× platinum single "Whatever You Like". The song found cross over success and was on Billboard's Hot 100 for 7 weeks. "Whatever You Like" was also a popular ringmaster spending 18 weeks at the top of Billboard's Hot Ringmaster's chart.

At the close of 2008 continued this string of success with his production on Soulja Boy Tell 'Em's "Kiss Me Thru The Phone". The song was downloaded over 2 million times and was also a popular ringmaster spending 11 weeks at the top of Billboard's Hot Ringmaster's chart. The song went on to reach number 3 on Billboard's Hot 100 Chart.

In 2009, Jonsin co-produced the single entitled "Sweet Dreams" on Beyonce's multi Grammy winning and double platinum album I Am…Sasha Fierce. This record achieved platinum status and reached #10 on Billboard's Hot 100 chart. Shortly after "Sweet Dreams" was released Jonsin reteamed with Pitbull, producing "Hotel Room Service" which was certified platinum and reached #8 on Billboard's Hot 100 chart.

The late summer of 2010 proved to be another high point for Jonsin's career. On August 16 Nelly released "Just a Dream", co-produced by Jonsin. This single went platinum and reached #3 on Billboard's Hot 100 chart. The day after "Just a Dream" was released, Kid Cudi released the Jonsin-produced "Erase Me" featuring Kanye West, which reached #22 on Billboard's Hot 100. Another August release Jonsin wrote and produced on was former American Idol winner Fantasia on "Falling In Love Tonight" off of Fantasia's Grammy nominated album Back To Me.

In early 2011 Nelly released "Gone" featuring Kelly Rowland, which Jonsin again co-produced. The single is a follow-up to Nelly's single "Dilemma" from 2002 which also featured Rowland and reigned for 10 weeks at #1 on Billboard's Hot 100. Jonsin produced Eminem's "Space Bound" from Recovery, the top selling album of 2010 as well as the 53rd Grammy's Best Rap Album.  "On My Level" was released by Wiz Khalifa (which features Too Short) on Rolling Papers on March 29, 2011.

Ventures

Rebel Rock Entertainment
Jonsin formed his record label, Rebel Rock Entertainment, in 2006. He signed B.o.B as the label's first artist, who in 2010 made his debut appearance on to the music scene with great success. B.o.B first released the double platinum single Nothin' On You which went to #1 on Billboard's Hot 100 and was nominated for 3 Grammys. The artist followed "Nothin' on You" with the triple platinum single "Airplanes" which made it to #2 on the Billboard Hot 100 and was itself nominated for a Grammy. B.o.B's third release, "Magic", went platinum and landed at #10 on Billboard's Hot 100.

Jonsin served as executive producer for B.o.B's debut album, The Adventures of Bobby Ray and is credited with choosing the artist's first single, "Nothin' on You". The song ultimately turned out to be one of the biggest records of the year. B.o.B. garnered several awards in late 2010 and early 2011. The rapper was nominated at the 53rd Annual Grammy Awards for five awards. Additionally in 2010 he was nominated for 3 American Music Awards, 3 BET Awards, 7 BET Hip Hop Awards, 4 MTV Video Music Awards, and 1 MTV Europe Music Award. B.o.B won the 2010 Soul Train Awards for Best Song "Nothin' On You" and gained a nomination for Best New Artist. B.o.B won the 2010 Teen Choice Awards Hook Up Song for "Airplanes" and was nominated for five others. Jonsin plans to follow up the success of his imprint's first artist with two other singers which he signed in 2011, Nick Merico and Leroy.

Rebel Rock Productions
Jonsin signed three producers, Finatik and Zac—an Australian production duo, and Danny Morris to his production company, Rebel Rock Productions. Danny Morris has worked with Jonsin on several releases including Usher's "There Goes My Baby", and "Making Love (Into the Night)", Fantasia's "Falling In Love Tonight", Kelly Rowland's "Take Everything" and "Motivation", Tank's "Scream", N Dubz's "Girls" and Wiz Khalifa's "On My Level". Finatik and Zac also have some upcoming releases for the Def Jam artist Wax ("Two Wheels/DUI") and the Universal Records artist Pac Div ("Loose").

Rebel Made
Jonsin formed Rebel Made Publishing Company in 2009 as a venture with his management team, Made. Writers signed to Rebel Made's roster include Terence Reid, formerly of The Network, along with fellow producers Finatik and Zac and Danny Morris.

Rebel Rock Racing
In 2010, Jonsin formed a racing team named Rebel Rock Racing, composed of him, Bucky Lasek (Pro Skateboarder and ten time X Games gold medalist) and Marius Avemarg (pro driver from Germany). The race team is supported by its ambassadors, Pitbull, Kyle Loza, and Yelawolf and sponsors such as Beats by Dre and Oakley.

American Idol
Jonsin appeared on the 10th season of American Idol in 2011. Jonsin was handpicked by Interscope's Jimmy Iovine as one of a handful of producers to serve as mentors to the contestants, working with them to produce and record cover songs for sale on iTunes.

Musical influences and techniques
Jonsin has cited DJ Jazzy Jeff and Jam Master Jay as strong musical influences on his style and has been known to use an MPC 3000, a Roland TR 808, and an Access Virus TI as his preferred gear.

Personal life 
Jim Jonsin was born in Brooklyn, New York City but was raised in South Florida. Jonsin's first job in the music business was as a scratch DJ. At the age of 14, Jonsin was spinning records at local skating rinks and other venues. By 18 Jonsin had graduated to spinning at Miami and South Florida dance clubs and formed his own record label called Cut It Up Def Records and produced one of its first singles, "Cut It Up Def" which independently sold 40,000 units. Jonsin had become well known in the region by the time he released his next production, the single "Party Time", which he also rapped on.

Jonsin's success in South Florida led him to a deal with California-based Heat Wave Records. Going by his new artist moniker, DJ Jealous J, he released a compilation of Miami bass songs titled Miami Bass Jams. The first two singles from the collection were certified Gold. Jonsin went on to tour with some of the most popular acts of the time such as Cypress Hill, 2 Live Crew, and Marky Mark and the Funky Bunch.

Discography

Singles produced

Awards and nominations
2006 BMI Urban Songwriter of the Year
2006 BMI Urban Award for "Grind with Me", "Let's Go", and "Your Body"
2006 BMI London Awards – Urban Award for "Here We Go"
2007 BMI Urban Awards for "Girl Tonite", "Here We Go", and "Unpredictable"
2008 Grammy Award – Best Rap Song – "Lollipop"
2009 BMI Creative Inspiration Producer Award
2009 BMI Urban Award for "Lollipop"
2009 Billboard #3 Hot 100 Producer of the Year
2009 Grammy Award nomination Album of the Year – Beyoncé – I Am… Sasha Fierce
2010 BMI Pop Award for "Whatever You Like"
2010 BMI Urban Awards for "Hotel Room Service" and "Kiss Me Thru The Phone"
2010 BMI London Awards – Pop Awards for "Hotel Room Service" and "Sweet Dreams"
2010 Billboard #16 R&B/Hip-Hop Producer of the Year
2010 Grammy Award nomination Album of the Year – Eminem – Recovery

References

External links
Rebel Rock
Rebel Rock — Rebel Rock Racing
 

Living people
American dance musicians
American electronic musicians
American hip hop DJs
American hip hop record producers
American music industry executives
American rhythm and blues keyboardists
American pop keyboardists
Businesspeople from Florida
Businesspeople from New York City
People from Brooklyn
Songwriters from Florida
Songwriters from New York (state)
Southern hip hop musicians
1970 births
Grammy Award winners for rap music
Record producers from New York (state)
21st-century American keyboardists
Michelin Pilot Challenge drivers